The Fantasy Effect is the debut studio album by American metalcore band, Reflections. The band released a single titled "Advance upon Me Brethren" on December 12, 2011, which later appeared on the album as track six. They were unsigned at the time of release, but soon after releasing The Fantasy Effect, Reflections were signed to record labels eOne and Good Fight.

Recording/production
The album was home-produced and recorded by the band itself using Mixcraft 4; a Windows music recording and mixing program.

Track listing

Reception 

The Fantasy Effect was generally received as an exceptionally good album by several reviewers. The only unfavorable comments made with the album from critics were the production value and the quality of Foster's vocals.

Personnel 
Reflections
 Jake Wolf – lead vocals
 Patrick Somoulay – lead guitar
 Charles Caswell – rhythm guitar, backing vocals
 Francis Xayana – bass
 Bo Blood – drums

References

2012 debut albums
Self-released albums
Reflections (Minnesota band) albums